The 2013–14 Russian Cup, known as the 2013–14 Pirelli–Russian Football Cup for sponsorship reasons, was the 22nd season of the Russian football knockout tournament since the dissolution of Soviet Union.

The competition started on 7 July 2013. The cup champion wins a spot in the 2014–15 UEFA Europa League play-off round.

First round 
The games were played on 7, 10, 11, 12 & 16 July 2013.

Second round 
The games were played on 22, 26, 30 & 31 July 2013.

Third round 
The games were played on 10, 11, 13, 17 & 21 August 2013.

Fourth round 
The 13 winners from the third round and the 19 FNL teams entered this round. The matches were played on 31 August and 1 September 2013.

Fifth round 
Teams from the Russian Football Premier League enter at this stage of the competition.

Round of 16 
The 16 winners from the fifth round enter. The matches were played in November 2013 - March 2014.

Quarter-finals 
The 8 winners from the round of 16 enter. The matches were played on March 26 and 27, 2014.

Semi-finals 
The 4 winners from the quarter-finals enter. The matches were played on April 16 and 17, 2014.

Final

Top scorer

References

External links 
 Official page 

Russian Cup seasons
Cup
Russian Cup